The 2016 Men's Junior Continental Championship is the tenth edition of the bi-annual tournament. It is played from 5–10 July on Gatineau, Quebec. The tournament will consist of seven teams. The top finisher at the final standing will qualify to 2017 U-21 World Championship.

Pool composition
Teams are distributed using the Serpentine system according NORCECA U-21 Ranking as of January 1, 2016

Pool standing procedure
Match won 3–0: 5 points for the winner, 0 point for the loser
Match won 3–1: 4 points for the winner, 1 points for the loser
Match won 3–2: 3 points for the winner, 2 points for the loser
In case of tie, the teams were classified according to the following criteria:
points ratio and sets ratio.

Preliminary round
All times are in Eastern Daylight Time–(UTC-04:00)

Pool A

Pool B

Final round

Bracket

Quarterfinals

Classification - 5th place

Semifinals

6th place

3rd place

Final

Final standing

All-Star Team

Most Valuable Player

Best Setter

Best Opposite

Best Outside Hitters

Best Middle Blockers

Best Libero

See also
2016 Women's Junior NORCECA Volleyball Championship

References

Men's NORCECA Volleyball Championship
NORCECA
2016 in Canadian sports
International volleyball competitions hosted by Canada